Finly, also known as Reedville Station, Carrollton, Kinder, & Tailholt, is an unincorporated community in Brandywine Township, Hancock County, Indiana.

History
A post office named Kinder was established on the present site of Carrollton (Finly), on or near there, on April 28, 1847. Its name was changed to Carrollton on January 26, 1869. The post office was maintained until September 30, 1905, when it was taken away and mail was delivered by a rural carrier from Fountaintown, two miles (3 km) southeast. Carrollton was then without a post office until October 13, 1912, when it was reestablished under the name of Finly, in honor of Congressman Finly Gray. A rural route from this post office was started on March 1, 1915. Before the completion of the railroad in 1869, the mail was delivered by a star carrier, who made two trips per week between Indianapolis and Rushville, as set forth under the history of mails at New Palestine.

The original plat of the town of Carrollton was surveyed by Hiram Comstock, on February 28, 1854, and contained thirty-two lots. The Reverend M.S. Ragsdale platted the only addition to the town on August 23, 1870.

The little town has borne more names than any other town in the county. Originally it was known as Kinder. After the name of the post office was changed to Carrollton in 1869, the town was given that name. The railroad and express companies adopted the name of Reedville for their stations. When the post office was reestablished in 1913, the name Finly was added to the list. The residents usually referred to their town as "Tailholt," upon which Indiana author James Whitcomb Riley (1849−1916) seized and, with poetic genius, immortalized the town.

Geography

Popular culture
The Little Town O' Tailholt

You kin boast about yer cities, and their stiddy growth and size,
And brag about yer County-seats, and business enterprise,
And railroads, and factories, and all sich foolery--
But the little Town o' Tailholt is big enough fer me!

You kin harp about yer churches, with their steeples in the clouds,
And gas about yer graded streets, and blow about yer crowds;
You kin talk about yer 'theaters,' and all you've got to see--
But the little Town o' Tailholt is show enough fer me!

They hain't no style in our town—hit's little-like and small--
They hain't no 'churches,' nuther--, jes' the meetin' house is all;
They's no sidewalks, to speak of—but the highway's allus free,
And the little Town o' Tailholt is wide enough fer me!

Some find it discommodin'-like, I'm willin' to admit,
To hev but one post-office, and a womern keepin' hit,
And the drug-store, and shoe-shop, and grocery, all three--
But the little Town o' Tailholt is handy 'nough fer me!

You kin smile and turn yer nose up, and joke and hev yer fun,
And laugh and holler 'Tail-holts is better holts'n none!
Ef the city suits you better w'y, hit's where you'd ort'o be--
But the little Town o' Tailholt's good enough fer me!

James Whitcomb Riley

See also
 Finly Hutchinson Gray

References

Unincorporated communities in Hancock County, Indiana
Unincorporated communities in Indiana
Indianapolis metropolitan area